The 2011–12 season was FC Sheriff Tiraspol's 15th season, and their 14th in the Divizia Naţională, the top-flight of Moldovan football.

Squad

Out on loan

Transfers

In

Out

Loans in

Loans out

Released

Competitions

Divizia Națională

Results summary

Results

League table

Moldovan Cup

UEFA Europa League

Qualifying rounds

Squad statistics

Appearances and goals

|-
|colspan="14"|Players away on loan :
|-
|colspan="14"|Players who left Sheriff Tiraspol during the season:

|}

Goal scorers

Disciplinary record

Notes
Note 1: Željezničar played their home match at Asim Ferhatović Hase Stadium, Sarajevo as it has a greater capacity than their own Stadion Grbavica.
Note 2: Sheriff Tiraspol played their home match at Malaya Sportivnaya Arena (Small Arena), Tiraspol as it is located in the same complex as Sheriff Stadium, the club's main stadium.

References

External links 
 

FC Sheriff Tiraspol seasons
Moldovan football clubs 2011–12 season